Cape Mentelle is a limestone headland on the Indian Ocean coast of south-western Western Australia. It lies on the Leeuwin-Naturaliste Ridge, halfway between Cape Naturaliste  to the north, and Cape Leeuwin  to the south, on the route of the Cape to Cape walking track.

History
The cape was named on 4 February 1803 by French navigator Nicolas Baudin, on his expedition to Australia, after Edme Mentelle (1730-1815), a French geographer, historian and cartographer.  It has given its name to a well known Margaret River winery, Cape Mentelle Vineyards.

See also
 Cape Clairault
 Cape Freycinet

References

Mentelle
Capes region of South West Western Australia